Homala is a genus of beetles in the family Tenebrionidae.

Species
 Homala integricollis Fairmaire, 1884
 Homala polita Solier 1835

References

 Tenebrionidae in Synopsis of the described Coleoptera of the world
 Organism Names
 Universal Biological Indexer

Tenebrionidae genera